The Gibraltar Stock Exchange (GSX) is a stock exchange based in Gibraltar. It was established in 2014, and began full operations in the first quarter of 2015. The stock exchange is the first fully licensed exchange in Gibraltar. The opening occurred in two distinctive phases. In the initial “soft launch” phase from the start of  November 2014, the GSX invited firms to apply for membership as Listing Members, with a number of applicants having expressed their keen interest. The full opening for listings themselves occurred during the first quarter of 2015.

As of October 2021, Gibraltar based Valereum Plc has an agreement to acquire 80% of GSX which was increased to 90% in February 2022. The deal is subject to Gibraltar Financial services commission (GFSC) approval. Valereum alongside partners endeavours to bridge traditional fiat and crypto currencies using the exchange. The deal is a catalyst for a robust regulatory framework with Anti money laundering (AML) measures which will make Gibraltar a renowned jurisdiction with a world first and world beating stock exchange.

It’s expected the deal with Valereum Plc is set for completion by the end of H1 2022 with Valereum’s plans being executed in H2 2022 and beyond and will be made public via the big RNS.

See also 
 List of stock exchanges
 List of European stock exchanges
 List of stock exchanges in the United Kingdom, the British Crown Dependencies and United Kingdom Overseas Territories

External links
Official Website
Announcement of the licence by Isolas
Gibraltar to launch its first stock exchange next month

Economy of Gibraltar
Stock exchanges in Europe